Lycomorphodes sordida is a moth of the family Erebidae. It was described by Arthur Gardiner Butler in 1877. It is found in the United States from southern Texas and southern California through Mexico, Guatemala, Costa Rica and Panama to Colombia.

The wingspan is 19–21 mm.

References

 Arctiidae genus list at Butterflies and Moths of the World of the Natural History Museum

Cisthenina
Moths described in 1877
Arctiinae of South America